Montague Lessler (January 1, 1869 – February 17, 1938) was an American lawyer and politician who served as a U.S. Representative from New York.

Born in New York City, Lessler attended the public schools.
He was graduated from the College of the City of New York in 1889 and later from the Columbia Law School.
He was admitted to the bar in 1891 and commenced the practice of his profession in New York City.

Lessler was elected as a Republican to the Fifty-seventh Congress in a special election to fill the vacancy caused by the resignation of Nicholas Muller and served from January 7, 1902 to March 3, 1903.

He was an unsuccessful candidate for reelection in 1902 for a full term in the Fifty-eighth Congress.

He resumed the practice of law in New York City until his death there on February 17, 1938. His remains were cremated.

See also
List of Jewish members of the United States Congress

Sources

1869 births
1938 deaths
City College of New York alumni
Columbia Law School alumni
Jewish members of the United States House of Representatives
Republican Party members of the United States House of Representatives from New York (state)